The Peel Regional Police (PRP) provide policing services for Peel Region (excluding Caledon) in Ontario, Canada. It is the second largest municipal police service in Ontario after the Toronto Police Service and third largest municipal force in Canada behind those of Toronto and Montreal, with 2,200 uniformed members and close to 875 support staff.

The Peel Regional Police serve approximately 1.48 million citizens of Mississauga and Brampton, located immediately west and northwest of Toronto, and provides law enforcement services at Toronto Pearson International Airport (located in Mississauga) which annually sees 50 million travellers. Although it is part of the Region of Peel, policing for the Town of Caledon which is at the north of Brampton, is the responsibility of the Ontario Provincial Police (OPP). The village of Snelgrove was once part of Caledon, but is now within Brampton, and is within the jurisdiction of Peel Regional Police.

The PRP also patrol the section of Highway 409 between the Toronto-Peel boundary line (immediately west of Highway 427) and Pearson Airport. Policing of all other 400-series highways that pass through the region, including highways 401, 403, 410, and 427 as well as the QEW freeway and the 407 ETR toll highway, are the responsibility of the OPP.

History
The Peel Regional Police were established in tandem with the creation of the Regional Municipality of Peel on January 1, 1974. It integrated the former police departments of Mississauga, Port Credit, Streetsville, Brampton, and Chinguacousy.

The Toronto Township Police Department was formed in January 1944 and was later renamed "Mississauga Police Department" in 1968. The Port Credit Police Department was founded with the township's incorporation in 1909. The Streetsville Police Department was formed in 1858. The Brampton Police Department dates to 1873, when it was created to replace policing from Chinguacousy. The Chinguacousy Township Police traces its roots back to 1853. Areas north of Mayfield Road (except Snelgrove) were transferred to the OPP when the northern half of Chinguacousy became part of Caledon (the southern half becoming part of Brampton) in 1974.
 
All the police departments were together merged into the Peel Regional Police Service in 1974. As of 2020, the Peel Regional Police have approximately 2,200 officers and 875 civilian support staff. Since the creation of the Peel regional police force, six deaths have been recorded, five from traffic accidents (the latest in March 2010) and one from a stabbing in 1984.

Command structure
The Peel Regional Police divide the region into five divisions. Major police stations are located in each division which is supported by smaller community police stations. These provide residents with services to deal with traffic complaints, neighborhood disputes, minor thefts, community issues, landlord-tenant disputes, found property, and  doubts or questions related to policing in the community.

11 Division
Commanded by Superintendent David Kennedy

3030 Erin Mills Parkway, Mississauga

12 Division
Commanded by Superintendent Robert Higgs

4600 Dixie Road, Mississauga
The Marine Unit at 135 Lakefront Promenade is located in this division. The unit is responsible for 105 square kilometre of waterways, including Lake Ontario and rivers that run in the region using 3 boats. It was created in 1974 and inherited 1 boat from the Port Credit Police Department.

21 Division
Commanded by Superintendent Navdeep Chinzer
 10 Peel Centre Drive, Suite C, Brampton

22 Division
Commanded by Superintendent Sean Gormley
7750 Hurontario Street, Brampton

Community Divisions
Square One, 100 City Centre Drive
Malton, 7205 Goreway Drive
Cassie Campbell, 1050 Sandalwood Parkway West

Airport Division
Currently commanded by Superintendent Robert Higgs, the airport division was established in 1997 following the departure of the Royal Canadian Mounted Police (RCMP). The airport division consists of uniformed, staff, tactical and plain clothes officers at 2951 Convair Drive, Mississauga.

Headquarters

7150 Mississauga Road, Mississauga

Rank structure

Uniform
As of January 2008, front line officers wear dark navy blue shirts, cargo pants with a red stripe and boots. Winter jackets are either black or reflective orange and yellow with the word police in white and blue at the back. Hats are standard forage caps with a red band. Yukon hats or embroidered toques are worn in the winter.

Frontline officers wear dark-navy shirts, v-neck sweaters (optional during cold weather months), and side-pocket patrol pants ("cargo pants") with a red stripe (ranks of sergeant and higher wear a black stripe down their pant leg in place of red); and officers wear dark-navy rank slip-ons on the epaulets of their shirts, sweaters, and jackets with embroidered Canadian flags and badge numbers (in white) beneath on each (rank insignia above the flag for ranks above constable).

Senior officers wear white shirts, dark-navy pants (no side pocket) with a black stripe, and dark-navy jackets.  Dark-navy v-neck sweaters are also worn.  Senior officers wear gold collar brass (on the collar of their shirts) and dark-navy rank slip-ons on the epaulets of their shirts, sweaters, and jackets with embroidered Canadian flags, no badge numbers, and applicable rank insignia above the flag.

The external carriers (body armour) worn by officers are black with silver police on the back and an embroidered patch over the right pocket with badge number embroidered in white.  This is the only uniform item that is black.

On dark-navy v-neck sweaters, an embroidered patch is worn on the left chest with police in white.

Officers' standard headdress is the forage (or peak) cap; the cap is dark-navy with black peak, red band, and silver cap badge (gold cap badge for senior officers).  Optional Yukon hat (artificial fur hat) or uniform toque can be worn in the winter.  Officers of the Sikh faith are permitted to wear uniform turbans (dark-navy blue with red stripe and cap badge).

The shoulder flash (embroidered patch) worn on each arm by officers ranked constable through staff sergeant has a white border, white lettering, black background, and coloured seal of the Regional Municipality of Peel.

The shoulder flash worn on each arm by senior officers (inspector and above) has a gold border, gold lettering, black background, and coloured seal of the Regional Municipality of Peel.

Fleet

The Peel Regional Police Service has a fleet of over 500 vehicles including:

 Ford Taurus Police Interceptor Sedans
 Dodge Charger (LX) cruisers (marked & unmarked)
 Harley-Davidson FL motorcycles (traffic services unit)
 Chevrolet Tahoe SUV (airport enforcement)
 Ford Explorer SUV (duty inspector & sergeant)
 Chevrolet Suburban SUV, Chevrolet Express & Ram Express (tactical rescue unit)
 Ford Escape Hybrid SUV (media relations)
 Terradyne Armored Vehicles Inc. GURKHA with Patriot MARS (mobile adjustable ramp system) - airport division tactical truck
 Marine 1 -  Hike Metal, twin diesel powered/twin propeller aluminum-hulled motor vessel powered by two 310 horse power Volvo Penta diesel engines
 Marine 2 -   2004 Zodiac Hurricane, 7.5 meter rigid hull inflatable boat powered by twin  outboard motors (two Yamaha 150 hp four-stroke outboard engines, 380 litres)
 Marine 3 – 18 foot aluminium boat with 25 hp outboard motor
 16 foot aluminium boat - from Port Credit Police in 1974; retired
 Trek Bicycle Corporation mountain hardtail 3700 mountain bikes
 T3 Motion, Inc. electric vehicles (airport enforcement)
 Ford F350 paddy wagon (court services)
 Dodge Magnum (traffic enforcement)

All marked vehicles are painted white with three blue stripes, a change made from the yellow standard used by GTA forces in the 1980s. In 2007, Peel Police spearheaded a campaign to amend provincial law to equip police cruisers with blue and red lights and deployed the first such cruiser in Ontario. As of 2008, newer cruisers sport a single blue stripe. The force's logo moves forward along the stripe with the motto and phone number on the rear back door.

Traffic enforcement has several vehicles that are not marked in the way described above.  These vehicles are painted in a solid colour, like most civilian vehicles, with the words Peel Regional Police applied in a semi-reflective decal in the same colour as the vehicles' paint.  Examples are cherry decals on red paint, or charcoal decals on black paint.

Weapons

Uniform patrol
 Smith & Wesson M&P .40 S&W caliber pistol - new standard sidearm for all officers in 2008
 Smith & Wesson 4046 .40 S&W pistol (phased out)
 Remington 870 shotgun (supervisors) 12 gauge
 Ruger PC40 police carbine (supervisors) .40 S&W (phased out)
 Colt Canada C8 police carbine (supervisors)
Tactical rescue unit & airport division
 Heckler & Koch Mk.23 .45 ACP (phased out)
 Smith & Wesson M&P .40 S&W caliber pistol
 Heckler & Koch MP5 9mm Para
 Heckler & Koch MP7 4.7x33mm
 Colt Canada C8 assault rifles 5.56×45mm NATO
 FN FAL para carbine 7.62×51mm NATO
 Remington 870 shotgun 12 gauge
 Remington 700 sniper rifle .308 Win
 Barrett M82-A1 sniper rifle .50 BMG

Units
Traffic enforcement
Regional breath
Regional traffic
Investigation
Divisional criminal investigation bureau
Homicide & missing persons bureau
Intimate partner violence
Special victims 
Central robbery bureau
Fraud bureau
Major drugs & vice
Street crimes
Guns & gangs  
Major collision bureau
Commercial auto crime bureau
Internet child exploitation (I.C.E.)
Tech crimes 
Forensic identification services 
Offenders management 
Special
Dive team
Tactical response
K-9 
Marine 
Training & recruiting
Community support
Divisional neighborhood policing 
Family violence
Internal affairs 
Auxiliary (auxiliary constable) - established in 1989 and has about 100 members. Members caps have a red-black Battenburg band instead of the solid red used for sworn members 
Crime prevention/alarm program
Diversity relations
Labor liaison
Drug education
Community liaison office

Awards

Peel Regional Police members are involved in fundraising for a variety of charities and community causes. They have annually raised over $1,000,000 for the Juvenile Diabetes Research Foundation and $140,000 through the "Cops for Cancer" program. They are also one of the region's largest donors to the United Way. Members of the force are involved in public service and volunteering throughout the community.

(1995) won the Webber Seavey Award for quality in law enforcement sponsored by the International Association of Chiefs of Police, and Motorola. The award was made for the development of a process that helps abused children through the justice system and into treatment with minimal personal trauma. They were also awarded the Certificate of Merit by the National Quality Institute's "Canada Awards of Excellence" program.
(1994) accredited by the Commission on Accreditation for Law Enforcement Agencies (CALEA), the first police service in Ontario to receive this distinction and  the fifth in Canada.

Misconduct allegations and convictions

2016 lawsuit against former Peel regional police chief, Jennifer Evans
Jennifer Evans and the Peel Police Service faced a 21 million dollar lawsuit alleging that they unlawfully interfered in the operation of the special investigations unit. Previously, Evans had faced numerous calls for resignation after refusing to stop carding and refusing to implement body worn cameras for all the  frontline police officers.

Other incidents

(2020) Three Peel Police officers shot and killed Ejaz Ahmed Choudry, after his daughter called a non-emergency ambulance to conduct a wellness check. Choudry suffered from schizophrenia and was alone in his apartment unit. Police denied Choudry's family offer of help to deescalate the situation. Three police officers entered the apartment unit through the balcony of the apartment, and fired a taser and plastic projectiles at Choudry but without effect. Then one of the officer shot and killed him. The SIU began a probe into the officers' actions, although the family has called for an independent public inquiry to be done. Three of the officers were cleared by the SIU.
(2020) Peel Police officers shot Chantelle Krupka once on the porch of her house, after shooting her with a taser. Police were responding to a domestic call at Krupka's house and allegedly shot Krupka when she was lying on the ground.Officer Valerie Briffa who shot Krupka, resigned from the force after the incident and was later charged with criminal negligence causing bodily harm, assault with a weapon and careless use of a firearm.
(2019) Peel Police officers were responding to a noise complaint and a report of a suspicious male causing a disturbance. The SIU investigated the death of Clive Mensah who was tasered by police. The outcome of the investigation was unknown.
(2019) Constable David Chilicki was arrested and charged with assault and mischief that stemmed from an off-duty incident involving a female. He was suspended with pay.
(2017) Constable Noel Santiago of 22 Division was arrested, charged and suspended from duty for defrauding the police services benefits provider. 
(2017) A Brampton Superior Court found constables Richard Rerrie, Damien Savino, Mihai "Mike" Muresan and Sergeant Emmanuel "Manny" Pinheiro perjured themselves at a suspect's trial to cover up the fact that they stole a Tony Montana statue from his downtown Toronto storage locker after his arrest.  There was also video surveillance of this theft.
(2017) Constable Donald Malott was involved in a domestic dispute with his wife. The OPP responded and charged him with careless storage of a firearm. He was accused of having several loaded firearms all over his home improperly stored. He was found guilty and was demoted to 2nd class constable.
(2016) Peel Police handcuffed a six year old Black girl and restrained her on her stomach for 30 minutes at her Missaussaga school. In March 2020, tribunal determined that the police officers had racially discriminated against the girl and that their actions were a "clear overreaction". In January 2021, damages were set at $35,000.
(2016) Constable Ryan Freitas caused a serious motor vehicle collision that seriously injured an innocent elderly women. The officer was responding to a radio call, and as he approached the intersection of Boulevard drive and Great lakes drive he failed to stop for the red light and collided violently with the women. The women suffered several broken bones. He was deemed at fault, disciplined and had to work several days without pay. He was also given a $1000 fine by the region of peel for the clean up crew that had to clean the road.
(2015) Constable Lyndon Locke did not face criminal charges after he pleaded guilty to discreditable conduct over sexual assault and utter death threats allegations, instead he was only "docked pay"

(2008) Constable Roger Yeo was accused of stalking young girls while off-duty in the summer and fall of 2005. During the course of the investigation into the stalking allegations Yeo said he had used steroids while on the job and claimed other officers had also done so. This prompted Chief Mike Metcalf to launch an investigation into steroid use in the force. Yeo was found guilty of discreditable conduct on April 29, 2008, and was suspended with pay. Yeo resigned on a date before his hearing, and all ongoing disciplinary proceedings were stayed.
(2006) A $9.5 million lawsuit was filed by a police officer, Constable Duane Simon, an 18-year veteran of the Toronto Police Service, alleging false imprisonment, abuse of public office, injurious falsehoods, negligent investigation and breach of the Canadian Charter of Rights and Freedoms after he had been arrested and charged with assault of a female Peel Regional police officer.
(2006) A $3.6 million lawsuit was filed by the parents of three Brampton teens alleging seven off-duty officers attacked them without cause in the fall of 2005 after one of the teens crashed his bicycle into a car owned by one of the men. The suit was settled out of court in June 2006.
(2006) A $12 million suit was filed by Orlando Canizalez and Richard Cimpoesu who claim that they were roughed up by off-duty police officers on 28 August 2006 after refusing to give up their videotape of officers partying behind a strip mall. Fourteen officers have been charged under the Police Services Act of Ontario with offences ranging from discreditable conduct to neglect of duty. Ten other officers have been disciplined for their roles in the incident. Of these, two officers were demoted to lower ranks, while others were suspended with pay from four to nine days. The lawsuit filed by the two men was pending.
(2006) A $14.6 million lawsuit was filed by former Toronto Argonaut football player Orlando Bowen, who said he was assaulted and falsely arrested on 26 March 2004 by two undercover officers outside a Mississauga night club. Bowen was tried and acquitted for drug possession in 2005, claiming the officers had planted drugs on him. The judge in the case described the testimony of the officers involved as "incredible and unworthy of belief". The Crown prosecutor attempted to have the charges against Bowen withdrawn before a verdict was rendered after Constable Sheldon Cook, a 14-year veteran of the force, was charged on 18 November 2005 by the Royal Canadian Mounted Police (RCMP) with drug possession and drug trafficking. RCMP officers tracked a shipment of cocaine from Pearson International Airport to Cook's home in Cambridge where they found 15 kilograms of the drug with a street value of more than $500,000.

Shooting death of Michael Wade Lawson
On 8 December 1988, 17-year-old Michael Wade Lawson was shot to death by two Peel Regional Police Constables. Anthony Melaragni No. 1192 and Darren Longpre No. 1139 were both charged with second-degree murder and aggravated assault after a preliminary hearing; both were later acquitted by a jury. The officers claimed that the stolen vehicle driven by Lawson was approaching the officers head-on in a threatening manner, and they then discharged their firearms.

An autopsy conducted by the Ontario Coroner's Office showed that the unarmed teenager was struck by a hollow-point bullet to the back of the head. This type of bullet was considered illegal at the time, as hollow-point bullets were not authorized for use by police officers in Ontario. Shortly after Lawson's death, the black Canadian community and the Attorney General of Ontario pressured the government to establish a race relations and policing task force. This task force made several recommendations and the result led the provincial government to create a police oversight agency known as the special investigations unit (S.I.U.) to investigate and charge police officers for their actions resulting in a civilian's injury or death.

Public complaints
The Peel Regional Police Public Complaints Investigation Bureau (PCIB) investigates all complaints made by the public in regards to the actions and services provided by police officers. PCIB is a branch of the Professional Standards Bureau.

In 2005, 158 public complaints were filed:
Two resulted in informal discipline
One resulted in charges under the Police Services Act of Ontario
None resulted in charges under the criminal code
155 were withdrawn by the complainants, resolved informally, or ruled invalid as they exceeded the time limit or the complainant was not directly affected

In 2004, 180 public complaints were filed:
Three resulted in informal discipline
None resulted in charges under the Police Services Act of Ontario
None resulted in charges under the criminal code
177 were withdrawn by the complainants, resolved informally, or ruled invalid as they exceeded the time limit or the complainant was not directly affected

See also
 Peel Regional Police Pipe Band

References

External links
Peel Regional Police

Law enforcement agencies of Ontario
Regional Municipality of Peel